Ingra may refer to:
 Ingra (construction company)
 Ingra, a character in The First (comics)